A mnemonic is a memory aid used to improve long-term memory and make the process of consolidation easier. Many chemistry aspects, rules, names of compounds, sequences of elements, their reactivity, etc., can be easily and efficiently memorized with the help of mnemonics. This article contains the list of certain mnemonics in chemistry.

Orbitals

Sequence of orbitals

Sober Physicists Don't Find Giraffes Hiding In Kitchens.
Note: After the k shell, they follow alphabetical order (skipping s and p as they came earlier).

Aufbau principle

The order of sequence of atomic orbitals (according to Madelung rule or Klechkowski rule) can be remembered by the following.

Periodic table

Periods

Periods 1, 2 and 3
{| class="wikitable"
|-
| H He Li Be B C N O F Ne Na (sodium) Mg Al Si P S Cl Ar
|}

Happy Harry Listens B B C Network Over France Nevertheless Nothing More Arose So Peter Stopped Cleaning Airgun K Ca.
Ha. Healthy Little Beggar Boys Catching Newts Or Fish.
Hi, Here Little Beatniks Brandish Countless Number Of Flick kNives.  Nagging Maggie Always Sighs, "Please Stop Clowning Around."  (adapted)
Hi Helium. Little Berries Borrow Carbs, NO Fight Needed.
Native Magpies Always Sit Peacefully Searching Clear Areas.
Naval Magistrates Always Signal Per Siren, Claiming Adequacy.
Naughty Margaret Always Sighs, "Please Stop Clowning Around."
Nellie's Naughty Magpie Always Sings Pop Songs Clearly After Killing Cathy.
All Silicon Ports. Superman Clean Argon's K-Capture.

Period 4
{| class="wikitable"
|-
| K (Potassium) Ca Sc Ti V Cr Mn Fe Co Ni Cu Zn Ga Ge As Se Br Kr
|}
Kindly Cannibals Scare Timid Visitors, 'n' Cruelly Menace Female Communist Nitwits Cuddling Zany Gabbling Geese Astride Several Brutal Kangaroos.
In reverse order: Kry Brother! SeAs of Germany and Gaul sink copper ships Nice and Cold From Manx to Crimea, Vancouver to Timor, and Scandinavia to the California Koast.
Kind Cats Scare Tiny Vicious Creatures, Maintaining Feline Connections Nice, Cute & Zen. Gallium Germinates As Selene Brings Krypton.

Period 5 

 Ruby, Sir, Yells "Zircon Nebulas !". Most Technicians Rule Rhodes and Paddle Against Cadence". India Sent Sebastian to Tell "Io Xe.

Transition metals

First
{| class="wikitable"
|-
| Sc Ti V Cr Mn Fe Co Ni Cu Zn
|}

 Scary Tiny Vicious Creatures are Mean; Females Come to NightClub Zen.
 SucTion VelCro Man Fears CoNiC uZi.

Second
{| class="wikitable"
|-
| Y Zr Nb Mo Tc Ru Rh Pd Ag Cd
|}
Yes S(Z)ir, Nob. Most Technicians Ruin Rob's Pale Silver Cadillac.

Third
{| class="wikitable"
|-
| La ... Hf Ta W Re Os Ir Pt Au Hg
|}

 Larry's Half Taken, Wendy Reached Out H(I)er Plate Audibly, Helga.
Late Harry Took Walk, Reached Office In Pajamas, After an Hour.
Lame Horned-Fox's Tail got Wet. Restless Ostrich Irrelevantly Painted Gold(AU) on Mercury(HG).

Lanthanides and actinides

Lanthanides
{| class="wikitable"
|-
| (La) Ce Pr Nd Pm Sm Eu Gd Tb Dy Ho Er Tm Yb Lu|}

 Ladies Can't Put Needles Properly in Slot-machines. Every Girl Tries Daily, However, Every Time You'd_be Lose.
  Languid Centaurs Praise Ned's Promise of Small European Garden Tubs; Dinosaurs Hobble Erratically Thrumming Yellow Lutes.
 "Lately, Central Park  Needed Primroses.   Small Entire Golden Tassels  Dyeing the Hollow Earth,  Tempting Your Love."Actinides
{| class="wikitable"
|-
| (Ac) Th Pa U Np Pu Am Cm Bk Cf Es Fm Md No Lr
|}Radiant Acting Thoroughly Protects yoUr Nepotism, Plutocratic America Cures-me & Berkeley California, Einstein Firmly Mended Noble Lawreins.Ace Thor Protects Uranus, Neptune, and Pluto. Amy Cured Berkeley, California. Einstein and Fermi Made Noble Laws.56 elements in sequence
{| class="wikitable"
|-
|H He Li Be B C N O F Ne Na Mg Al Si P S Cl Ar  K Ca Sc Ti V Cr Mn Fe Co Ni Cu Zn Ga Ge As Se Br Kr  Rb Sr Y Zr Nb Mo Tc Ru Rh Pd Ag Cd In Sn Sb Te I Xe  Cs Ba
|}Here Lies Benjamin Bones. Cry Not Oh Friend Needlessly. Nature Magnifies All Simple People Sometimes Clowns And Kings Can Scream Till Vast Crowds Moan. Fear Conquers Neither Courageous Zealous Gallant Gents. As Seen Brown Karate Robes Strip Yobs. Zurich Noble Mortals Track Ruddy Rhubarb. Paid Silver Candid Indian Sons Sobbing Tears In Xcess Cease Bawling.Groups

Group 1 (alkali metals)
{| class="wikitable"
|-
| Li Na K Rb Cs Fr
|}
Lithium, Sodium, Potassium, Rubidium, Caesium, FranciumLittle Nasty Kids Rub Cats FurLittle Naughty Kids Robs Cents From (me)Little Naughty Kids Ruin Ben's Convenient Store ForeverLittle Nathan Knew Rubies Cost FortunesLittle Naughty Kids Rob Crispy FriesGroup 2 (alkaline earth metals)
{| class="wikitable"
|-
| Be Mg Ca Sr Ba Ra
|}
Beryllium, Magnesium, Calcium, Strontium, Barium, RadiumBearded Muggers Came Straight Back Rapidly.Beer Mugs Can Serve Bar Rats.Ben Meg & Casia Stroll away to Bar of RadiumGroup 13
{| class="wikitable"
|-
| B Al Ga In Tl|}
Boron, Aluminium, Gallium, Indium, ThalliumBAlm Game In TailBowler Ali Gave Instant TeaBAG ITBears Always Gave Indians TroubleGroup 14
{| class="wikitable"
|-
| C Si Ge Sn Pb 
|}
Carbon, Silicon, Germanium, Tin (stannum in Latin), Lead (plumbum in Latin)

CSI Gets Stan Plums (comment: plum and plumb are homophones)Can Simple Germans Snare (Tiny) Public (Lead)?Chemistry Sir Gets Snacks Publicly

Group 15 (Pnictogens)
{| class="wikitable"
|-
| N P As Sb Bi
|}

Nitrogen, Phosphorus, Arsenic, Antimony, Bismuth, Moscovium.

 No Person can Assassinate Sebastian Billy in McAllen (place).

Group 16 (Chalcogens)

{| class="wikitable"
|-
| O S Se Te Po Lv
|}
Oxygen, Sulfur, Selenium, Tellurium, Polonium

Old Style Sets TemPoOld TSangpo Seems Terribly Polluted Lately.Ottoman Sultan Sends Textiles to Poor Ladies.Group 17 (Halogens)
{| class="wikitable"
|-
| F Cl Br I At Ts
|}
Fluorine, Chlorine, Bromine, Iodine, Astatine, Tennessine
Funny Clowns Broil Innocent Ants.
Fast Clouds Break In Atlantis.Father Clark B(r)lesses Ivan A(s)tlast.First Class Briyani In AustraliaGroup 18 (noble gases)
{| class="wikitable"
|-
| He Ne Ar Kr Xe Rn
|}
Helium, Neon, Argon, Krypton, Xenon, Radon.

Hero Never Argues, Kryptonite Xterminates RaoHero Needs Arguable Kryptic Xes. Right-on.He Never Arrived; Karen eXited with Ron. He Needs A Kickin', Xylophone-playin' Racehorse! (And... Oh, gee, now we need to add Oganesson (Og)!)

 Properties of elements 

Abundance of elements on earth's crust

 Only Strong Athletes In College Study Past Midnight
 Oh, see(Si), Alfie(Fe) Cannot(Na) Kiss Meg(Mg)

As they are present in trace quantities they are measured in parts per million(ppm).

Activity series of metals

 Please Stop Calling Me A Cute Zebra Crab I Like Her Call Smart Goat Please Stop Calling Me A Carless Zebra Crab Instead Try Learning How Copper Miners Save Gold Pit Popular Scientists Can Make A Zoo In Low Humid Climate ...

Note that Carbon and Hydrogen are non-metals, used as a baseline.Kangaroos  Naturally Muck About in Zoos For Purple Hippos Chasing Aardvarks.Katty's Naughty Cat Mingled with Alice and Zarina; Fearlessly Plundering Her Cupboard of Gold.Papa Said Call Me After Zinc Interacts Tin Leading Hydrogen Co-operate Mr. Sylvester to Gain Popularity.Pretty(Potassium)  Sally(Sodium) Could(Calcium) Marry(Magnesium) A(Aluminium) Crazy(Carbon) Zulu(Zinc) IN(Iron/Nickel) Tree(Tin) Lined(Lead) House(Hydrogen) Causing(Copper) Strangely(Silver) Glancing(Gold) People(Platinum).Electronegativity

Pronounce: FOClN BrIS CHP.

(F)irst (O)ff, (Cl)ean (N)ow; (Br)ing (I)n (S)ome (C)lothes, (H)ats, and (P)ants. (First off, clean now. Bring in some caps, hats {and} pants.)

Electrochemical seriesPaddy Still Could Marry A Zulu In The Lovely Honolulu Causing Strange Gazes. Passive Sarcasm Can Mutate Angry Zombies InTo Large Hypocritical Cold Sexy Guys.
 Poor Science Course Makes A Zany Idiot Totally Lose His Composure, Sir! Good!

 Reactions and ions 

Redox reactions
A redox reaction is a chemical reaction in which there is a change in oxidation state of atoms participating in the reaction.

Ions
An atom (or ion) whose oxidation number increases in a redox reaction is said to be oxidized (and is called a reducing agent). It is accomplished by loss of one or more  The atom whose oxidation number decreases gains (receives) one or more electrons and is said to be reduced. This relation can be remembered by the following mnemonics.
 Leo says Ger! or Leo the lion, Ger! can be used to represent Loss of electron is oxidation; Gain of electron is reduction.Oil Rig: Oxidation is loss; Reduction is gain (of electrons).Cations and anions
Cations are positively (+) charged ions while anions are negatively (−) charged. This can be remembered with the help of the following mnemonics.Cats have paws ⇔ Cations are pawsitive. Ca+ion: The letter t in cation looks like a + (plus) sign.An anion is a negative ion. (Anegativeion ⇒ Anion).Oxidation vs. reduction: electrochemical cell and electron gain/loss

 AN OIL RIG CAT:
 At the ANode, Oxidation Involves Loss of electrons.
 Reduction Involves Gaining electrons at the CAThode.
 LOAN - Left Anode Oxidation Negative. 
In written representation of galvanic cell, anode is written on the left. It is the electrode where oxidation takes place. It is the negative electrode. Obviously, the opposite properties (Right/Cathode/Reduction/Positive) are found on the cathode. Hence, by remembering LOAN mnemonic, we can arrive at the corresponding properties for the cathode.
LEO the lion says GER [grr]:
 "Loss of Electrons, Oxidation; Gain of Electrons, Reduction".

Electrodes
An electrode in which oxidation takes place is called an anode while in that which reduction takes place is called cathode. This applies for both electrolytic and electrochemical cells, though the charge on them reverses. The red cat and an ox mnemonics are useful to remember the same.Red cat: Reduction at cathodeAn ox: Anode for oxidation.
The words oxidation and anode, both begin with vowels.
Also, both reduction and cathode begin with consonants.
Fat Cat: electrons flow From Anode To Cathode
LOAN:  Left side;Oxidation;Anode;Negative.

 Compounds  

Diatomic molecules
Molecules exhibiting diatomic structures can be remembered through the following mnemonics.Have No Fear Of Ice Cold Beer. Horses Need Oats For Clear Brown Eyes (I's).Her Nana's Only Functioning Clicker Broke Instantly.BrINClHOF: say Brinkelhof.I Bring Clay For Our New House.Hydrogen bonds
Hydrogen forms hydrogen bonds with three elements which are nitrogen (N), oxygen (O) and fluorine (F). The names of these elements can be remembered by the following mnemonic.
 Hydrogen is FON! (fun).Polyatomic ions: −ate and -ite ionsSuper Popeye Constantly Clubbed Brutus In Nevada.Nick Brit the Camel ate an Inky Clam with Crêpes for Supper in Phoenix.Number of consonants denotes number of oxygen atoms. Number of vowels denotes negative charge quantity. Inclusion of the word "ate" signifies that each ends with the letters a-t-e.  To use this for the -ite ions, simply subtract one oxygen but keep the charge the same.

Organic chemistry

 Prefixes for naming carbon chains 
The prefixes for naming carbon chains containing one to four carbons. For chains containing five or more carbons, the inorganic prefixes (pent, hex, etc.) are used.

 Monkeys Eat Peeled BananasCarboxylic acids

Common names of homogeneous aliphatic carboxylic acids,Frogs Are Polite, Being Very Courteous.Dicarboxylic acids

The sequence of dicarboxylic acids can be remembered with following mnemonics.Oh My, Such Good Apples.Oh My Stars, Green Apples.Oh My, Such Good Apple Pie, Sweet As Sugar.Oh My Stars, Go Ahead PleaseOMSGAP - is a phonetic word for the first letters of the first six dicarboxylic acids above in sequence can be said as below.
 Oh My Sir, Give A Party.

Aromatic compounds

m-directing groupsQueen Elizabeth Second's Navy Commands, Controls, Communicates.o,p-directing groups

AHA AHA P.
Note: -NH2,-NHR and NR2 are para directing groups but not -NR3+

E-Z notation for isomers

"E" for enemies. i.e higher priority groups on opposite sides. Z form has higher priority groups on same side.

"Z" means same side i.e. high priority groups on same side.

Cis–trans isomerism

Cis starts with a C and the functional groups form a C.

Trans, therefore is the other one by default.

Benzene ring: order of substitutes

From R group moving around the ring:

 Benzene likes to ROMP.Biochemistry

Essential amino acids

 PVT TIM HaLL and TT HALL Very IMPortant.
These Ten Valuable Acids Have Long Preserved Life In Men
 MATT HILL, VP
 LIFT HIM KIW(V)I
 TV FILM HW(R)K. Any Help In Learning These Little Molecules Proves Truly Valuable. This method begins with the two amino acids that need some qualifications as to their requirements.

Krebs cycle
To remember Krebs cycle (citric acid cycle, tricarboxylic acid cycle);
  Caesar's Armies Invaded Other Kingdoms Searching For Many Oranges.Citric Acid Is One Key Substrate For Mitochondrial Oxidation

Plant nutrients
To remember the elements necessary for agriculture;C (see) Hopkins CaFe, Mighty-good Man, Cu (see your) Money, hope they are Closed or out of Business.For remembering macronutrients; C. HOPKiN'S Ca Mg (C. Hopkins coffee mug).MagiCal CKN SHOP'' (Magical Chicken SHOP).

  Elements Comprising the Human Body 
To remember the elements comprising the human body;Chopin's CaFeI.P. Cohn's CaFe'''

See also
List of medical mnemonics
List of mnemonics

References

External links

"Mnemonics for the Entire Periodic Table"
Science jokes and mnemonics

Mnemonics
Science-related lists
Science mnemonics
Mnemonics